Robert Booth Goodwin II (born 1971), known commonly as Booth Goodwin, is an American attorney with Goodwin & Goodwin LLP in Charleston, West Virginia. He served as the United States Attorney for the Southern District of West Virginia from 2010 until 2015. Goodwin was a candidate for Governor of West Virginia in 2016.

Early life and education
Goodwin was born in Charleston, West Virginia in 1971. He attended West Virginia University, where he graduated cum laude with a Bachelor of Science in economics 1993. He then earned his Juris Doctor from Washington and Lee University School of Law in 1996.

Career
On January 20, 2010, President Barack Obama nominated Goodwin to serve as United States Attorney for the Southern District of West Virginia. He was confirmed by the United States Senate on May 26, 2010 and was sworn into office on June 25, 2010.

On December 28, 2015, Goodwin announced that he would be stepping down from his position as U.S. Attorney for the Southern District of West Virginia effective at the end of 2015  and returning to private law practice. On January 1, 2016, Goodwin filed candidacy papers with the West Virginia Secretary of State's office to run for governor of West Virginia as a Democrat in the 2016 election. He lost the Democratic primary to Jim Justice, who went on to win the general election. Goodwin carried two counties, including his home county of Kanawha, as well as neighboring Jackson. He finished in second place with 25%, behind Justice and ahead of Jeff Kessler.

Personal life
Goodwin's father, Joseph Robert Goodwin, was appointed in 1995 by President Bill Clinton to serve as a federal judge for the United States District Court for the Southern District of West Virginia. Goodwin's cousin, Carte Goodwin, briefly served as the junior United States senator from West Virginia in 2010 when he was appointed to fill the vacancy caused by the death of Robert Byrd.

His wife, Amy Shuler Goodwin, is the mayor of Charleston, West Virginia, having taken office on January 7, 2019. That means that he is the first gentleman of Charleston since 2019.  They have two sons.

References

External links
 

1971 births
20th-century American lawyers
21st-century American lawyers
Goodwin family
Lawyers from Charleston, West Virginia
Living people
United States Attorneys for the Southern District of West Virginia
Washington and Lee University School of Law alumni
West Virginia Democrats
West Virginia University alumni